The Indian national cricket team visited Sri Lanka in August 2006 to play limited overs matches against the Sri Lankan national cricket team. Only one was played, but with no result, and then the tour was cancelled. The Indian team was captained by Rahul Dravid and Sri Lanka by Mahela Jayawardene.

Squads

Tour Matches

50 Overs Match

ODI series

1st ODI

2nd ODI

3rd ODI

References

External links

2006 in Indian cricket
2006 in Sri Lankan cricket
2006
International cricket competitions in 2006
Sri Lankan cricket seasons from 2000–01